Nick King may refer to:

 Nick King (politician) (born 1949), member of the Missouri House of Representatives
 Nick King (basketball) (born 1995), American basketball player

See also
 Nicholas King (1933-2012), American actor and horticulturist